Speller Aa is a river of North Rhine-Westphalia and Lower Saxony, Germany. It flows into the Große Aa near Lünne.

The upper reaches of the Speller Aa have other names, from the source to the mouth Stollenbach, Mettinger Aa, Recker Aa, Hopstener Aa, Speller Aa.

See also

List of rivers of Lower Saxony

References

Rivers of Lower Saxony
Rivers of North Rhine-Westphalia
Rivers of Germany